Symphyotrichum oolentangiense (formerly Aster oolentangiensis and Aster azureus), commonly known as skyblue aster and azure aster, is a species of flowering plant in the family Asteraceae native to eastern North America.

Description
The alternate and simple leaves have a rough texture. The composite flowers, produced between August and October, have blue to violet rays.

Taxonomy
American botanist John Leonard Riddell originally described this species in a publication dated to April 1835 as Aster oolentangiensis after finding it in forests on the Olentangy River near Worthington, Ohio. Riddell originally misspelled the name of the river with two Os. The synonym Aster azureus has also been used, but this was not published until November 1835, so Riddell's epithet has priority.

Along with many other species, Symphyotrichum oolentangiense was formerly included in the genus Aster. However, this broad circumscription of Aster is polyphyletic, and the North American asters are now classified in Symphyotrichum and several other genera.

Distribution and habitat
Symphyotrichum oolentangiense is found in prairies, open woodlands, savannahs and other open habitats. It occurs widely in the Midwestern United States and in eastern prairies, from Texas to Minnesota. It also extends into Mexico in Coahuila and to Ontario in Canada. The species is endangered in New York.

Ecology
The flowers attract a wide variety of insect species, including bees, bee flies, butterflies, beetles, and others. A wide variety of herbivorous insects also consume the vegetation. The seeds are dispersed by wind. The species is typical of higher quality natural areas, especially those with disturbances such as wildfire.

Notes

Citations

References

oolentangiense
Flora of Canada
Flora of the United States
Flora of Coahuila
Plants described in 1835
Taxa named by John Leonard Riddell